Paul Rayment (born 24 July 1965) is a South African cricketer. He played in 49 first-class and 58 List A matches between 1984/85 and 1993/94.

See also
 List of Eastern Province representative cricketers

References

External links
 

1965 births
Living people
South African cricketers
Eastern Province cricketers
Western Province cricketers
Cricketers from Cape Town